The DOE Bridge over Laramie River was a Pratt half-hip pony truss bridge located near Bosler, Wyoming, which carried Albany County Road CNA-740 across the Laramie River. The bridge was built in 1926 by contractor N. A. Swenson; it was originally part of the Lincoln Highway. In 1932, the bridge was replaced and moved to its current location. It was the last two-span Pratt half-hip truss bridge remaining in Wyoming.

The bridge was added to the National Register of Historic Places on February 22, 1985. It was one of several bridges added to the NRHP for its role in the history of Wyoming bridge construction.

See also
List of bridges documented by the Historic American Engineering Record in Wyoming

References

External links

Road bridges on the National Register of Historic Places in Wyoming
Bridges completed in 1926
Buildings and structures in Albany County, Wyoming
1926 establishments in Wyoming
Historic American Engineering Record in Wyoming
National Register of Historic Places in Albany County, Wyoming
Pratt truss bridges in the United States